Zygochloa is a genus of desert plants in the grass family known only from Australia. The only known species is Zygochloa paradoxa, commonly known as sandhill canegrass. It occurs in extremely arid areas such as the Simpson Desert.

References

Panicoideae
Poales of Australia
Monotypic Poaceae genera
Flora of the Northern Territory
Flora of New South Wales
Flora of Queensland
Flora of South Australia
Taxa named by Robert Brown (botanist, born 1773)